Thomas Jenner (1 February 1689, in Standish – 12 January 1768, in Oxford) was an English academic.

Jenner was educated at Magdalen College, Oxford, of which college he was a Fellow from 1715 to 1745. He was Lady Margaret Professor of Divinity at Oxford from 1728 and its President from 1745, holding both posts until his death.

References

1689 births
1768 deaths
People from Gloucestershire
18th-century English theologians
Alumni of Magdalen College, Oxford
Fellows of Magdalen College, Oxford
Presidents of Magdalen College, Oxford
Lady Margaret Professors of Divinity